Events from the year 2014 in Antarctica

Events

Date unknown

Deaths

References

 
2010s in Antarctica
Years of the 21st century in Antarctica